Trade unions in Saint Lucia first emerged in the 1930s. The St Lucia Teachers' Association was established in 1934 as a professional organisation. Following the formalisation of collective bargaining on the island in 1938, the Saint Lucia Workers' Co-operative Union was founded in 1939.

All unions on the island, with the exception of the National Workers Union, are members of the Trade Union Federation (TUF), the country's national centre.

The following unions  operate in Saint Lucia:

References